An offset in law, is a reduction in the amount of a judgment granted to a losing party based on debts owed by the prevailing party to the losing party. For example, if an employee successfully sued an employer for wrongful termination, the employer might be entitled to an offset if the employer could demonstrate that it had previously made an overpayment to that employee which had not been returned. A party may similarly be entitled to an offset where it can demonstrate that the prevailing party has already received compensation for its injuries through insurance, a judgment against another party liable for those injuries, or some other source.

Judgment (law)